7178 aluminum alloy is wrought alloy. It has high zinc content. After annealing, aluminum alloy 7178 has high machinability. Resistance welding can be used.

Chemical composition 
The chemical composition of Aluminium / Aluminum 7178 alloy is outlined in the following table. It is difficult to cold work. Forming is hard to use for this alloy. It has high machinability.

Properties

Designations 
Aluminium alloy 7178 alloy can be designated as:

 ASTM B209
 ASTM B221
 ASTM B241
 ASTM B316
 QQ A-200/13
 QQ A-200/14
 QQ A-250/14
 QQ A-250/21
 QQ A-250/28
 QQ A-430
 SAE J454

Advantages 
 High corrosion resistance
 High tensile strength
 Excellent polish
 High machine strength
 High creep resistance
 High temperature strength
 High mechanical properties

Applications 

 Aircraft components
 Petroleum refineries
 Boilers
 Heat exchangers
 Condensers
 Pipelines
 Cooling towers
 Steam exhausts
 Electric generation plants

References

External links 
 https://www.makeitfrom.com/material-properties/7178-T6-Aluminum
 https://www.substech.com/dokuwiki/doku.php?id=wrought_aluminum-zinc-magnesium_alloy_7178

Aluminium–zinc alloys